Ede Virág-Ébner (12 August 1912 – 22 October 1951) was a Hungarian wrestler. He competed in the men's freestyle light heavyweight at the 1936 Summer Olympics.

Virag was also a professional wrestler working in Hungary, Germany, France, Switzerland, and for the National Wrestling Alliance in North America. He worked in Canada, New York City, Mid-Atlantic, St. Louis, Minnesota, Chicago and Kansas.

References

External links
 

1912 births
1951 deaths
Hungarian male sport wrestlers
Olympic wrestlers of Hungary
Wrestlers at the 1936 Summer Olympics
Martial artists from Budapest